Megan Fox is an American actress and model. She rose to prominence with her lead role in the science fiction action film Transformers (2007). Since then, Fox has received numerous awards and nominations, including four Teen Choice Awards and two Scream Awards. She has received seven Golden Raspberry Award nominations, and has won one.

In 2005, Fox received a Young Artist Award nomination for her starring role in the sitcom Hope & Faith (2004–2006). Two years later, her performance as Mikaela Banes in Transformers earned her a Golden Schmoes Award for Best T&A of the Year and a Scream Award for Sci-Fi Siren, as well as nominations for a National Film Award, an MTV Movie & TV Award, and three Teen Choice Awards. She won a Scream Award for Best Science Fiction Actress and a Teen Choice Award for Choice Movie: Summer Actress for her reprisal of Mikaela Banes in the sequel Transformers: Revenge of the Fallen (2009). Fox also won a Spike Video Game Award for Best Performance By A Human Female in the video game adaptation of the film. The same year, she received a nomination from the Alliance of Women Film Journalists for Actress Most in Need of a New Agent.

Fox won a Teen Choice Award for Choice Movie Actress: Horror/Thriller for her performance in the black comedy horror film Jennifer's Body (2009). Her performance as Tallulah Black in the western film Jonah Hex (2010) earned her two Golden Raspberry Awards nominations. In 2014, Fox starred as April O'Neil in the superhero film Teenage Mutant Ninja Turtles. Although she won a Golden Raspberry Award for Worst Supporting Actress, she also received a Kids' Choice Awards nomination for Favorite Movie Actress for her performance. She reprised the role in the sequel Teenage Mutant Ninja Turtles: Out of the Shadows (2016), where she received a Kids' Choice Award and a Golden Raspberry Award nomination. She was nominated again for a Golden Raspberry Award for her role in the 2021 film Midnight in the Switchgrass. Outside of her work in film, Fox has been nominated for four Teen Choice Awards for her fashion.

Awards and nominations

Notes

References

External links
 

Fox, Megan